

Kenneth Stirling Conservation Park is a protected area in the Australian state of South Australia consisting of five parcels of land located in the gazetted localities of Balhannah, Basket Range, Carey Gully, Forest Range and Mount George about  east of the state capital of Adelaide.

The conservation park was constituted under the National Parks and Wildlife Act 1972 on 13 December 1990 in respect to several parcels of land in the cadastral unit of the Hundred of Onkaparinga.

It was named after Kenneth Stirling who was “a major donor to the preservation of native vegetation in South Australia.” 

As of 2002, access to the conservation park for the purpose of mining exploration under the Mining Act 1971 was not permitted.

The conservation park is classified as an IUCN Category III protected area. It was listed on the now-defunct Register of the National Estate after late 1994.

See also
Protected areas of South Australia

References

External links
Kenneth Stirling Conservation Park webpage on the Protected Planet website

Conservation parks of South Australia
1990 establishments in Australia
Protected areas established in 1990
Adelaide Hills
South Australian places listed on the defunct Register of the National Estate